You Hurt My Feelings is a 2023 American comedy-drama film written and directed by Nicole Holofcener. It stars Julia Louis-Dreyfus, Tobias Menzies, Michaela Watkins, Arian Moayed and  Jeannie Berlin.  

The film was shot in New York City in May 2022 and had its world premiere at the 2023 Sundance Film Festival on January 22, 2023. It is scheduled to be released on May 26, 2023, by A24.

Premise
Beth struggles with a lack of self-confidence and her marriage with unsuccessful therapist Don is affected by a betrayal. Before this, they had a peaceful but co-dependent relationship, which makes their only child uncomfortable. Beth's sister helps her cope with the pain, possibly because of her own struggles with husband Mark, who is a struggling actor.

Cast 
 Julia Louis-Dreyfus as Beth, a novelist who also teaches writing classes
 Tobias Menzies as Don, a therapist 
 Michaela Watkins as Sarah, Beth's sister
 Arian Moayed as Mark, Sarah's husband
 Owen Teague as Elliott, Beth and Don's son
 Jeannie Berlin as Georgia, Beth and Sarah's mother
 Amber Tamblyn as Carolyn 
 David Cross as Jonathan
 Zach Cherry as Jim
 Sarah Steele as Frankie
 LaTanya Richardson Jackson as Sylvia
 Sunita Mani as Dr. Allen
 Deniz Akdeniz as Vince
 Clara Wong as Ali
Source:

Production 
In October 2021, it was announced Julia Louis-Dreyfus would star in and produce the film, then titled Beth and Don, with Nicole Holofcener directing from a screenplay she wrote. In May 2022, Tobias Menzies, Michaela Watkins, Arian Moayed, Owen Teague, Jeannie Berlin, Bill Camp and Elizabeth Marvel joined the cast of the film. 

Principal photography began in May 2022, in New York City. Cinematographer Jeffrey Waldron said, "I worked to build a natural, inviting New York look that didn't distract from the unfolding story, but brought cinematic punctuation to its important human moments". To achieve this, he used an Arri Alexa Mini camera with custom-adjusted Panavision Primo lenses. In order to make the film feel "filmic, human and handmade", he further softened and reduced contrast in prep with the help of a custom film emulation LUT.

Release
A24 picked up the U.S. distribution rights at the 2021 American Film Market. You Hurt My Feelings premiered on January 22, 2023, at the Sundance Film Festival. It is scheduled to be released on May 26, 2023.

Reception 
On review aggregator website Rotten Tomatoes, the film has an approval rating of 96% based on 53 reviews, with an average rating of 7.7 out of 10. The website's critics consensus reads: "Smart, funny, and above all entertaining, You Hurt My Feelings finds writer-director Nicole Holofcener as sharply perceptive as ever." On Metacritic, the film has a weighted average of 75 out of 100 based on 17 critic reviews, indicating "generally favorable reviews".

References

External links 
 
 
 

2023 comedy-drama films
2023 independent films
2020s American films
2020s English-language films
A24 (company) films
American comedy-drama films
American independent films
FilmNation Entertainment films
Films directed by Nicole Holofcener
Films scored by Michael Andrews
Films shot in New York City
Films with screenplays by Nicole Holofcener